The Wisconsin–Stevens Point Pointers football program is the intercollegiate American football team for the University of Wisconsin–Stevens Point located in the U.S. state of Wisconsin.

Notable former players
Notable alumni include:
 Kirk Baumgartner
 Bob Bostad
 Ted Fritsch
 Clint Kriewaldt
 Barry Rose

References

 
American football teams established in 1895
1895 establishments in Wisconsin